Clavator moreleti is a species of air-breathing land snail, terrestrial pulmonate gastropod mollusks in the family Acavidae.

This species is endemic to Madagascar.

References

Acavidae
Gastropods described in 1868
Taxonomy articles created by Polbot
Endemic fauna of Madagascar